The Majhraut or Majraut is a clan of Yaduvanshi Ahir that inhabits the Indian state of Bihar and Jharkhand. They are believed to be descended from the Yadav king Madhu who ruled Mathura.
 
Like Krishnaut even Majhraut Ahirs never sold either milk, ghee or butter and have, to a large extent, were cultivators. Some of them were landlords of large estates.

Origin and History
The Yadavs who migrated from Mathura (Braj) to Bihar and its surrounding areas came to be known as Mathraut or Majrauth.

List of Rulers and Chieftain
In Bihar and Jharkhand there were many rulers and zamindars belonging to Ahir (Yadav) caste. During British Raj, the Ahir zamindars were predominantly found in northern and eastern parts of Bihar. Most of them belonged to Krishnaut and Majhraut clans of Ahir

Rulers of Varman dynasty.
Ahir Chieftain of Murho Estate.
Zamindar of Ranipatti Estate.
Landlords of Khurda Karveli.
Landlords of Gosaidaspur Estate.
Zamindar of Belwarganj Estate.
Zamindar of Pipra Estate.
Zamindar of Shaligrami.

Distribution and Title

Distribution
Majhrauts are found all over Bihar but numerically they exceed other sub-caste in Saharsa and it's adjoining district of Bihar. While most Yadavs were small scale peasants in North and Central India, a small number of them acquired land in newly reclaimed area of Eastern Bihar (Purnea and Saharsa) and became big land holders.

Titles
The titles generally used by Majhraut and other sub-caste of Ahirs in Bihar are Yadav, Raut, Gope, Ray, Rai, Roy, Mandal, Singh, etc.

Notable persons
Rash Bihari Lal Mandal, zamindar of Madhepura and founder of Yadav Mahasabha.
Mahendra Gop, a freedom revolutionary.
Bhupendra Narayan Mandal, a socialist leader.
Shivnandan Prasad Mandal, a Politician.
Kamleshwari Prasad Yadav, a member of the Constituent Assembly of India from 1946 to 1950.
B.P. Mandal, Ex-Cm of Bihar and chairman of Mandal commission.
Bijendra Prasad Yadav, a Politician, currently Minister in Bihar Government.
Lalit Kumar Yadav, a Politician, currently Minister in Bihar Government.
Prof. Chandrashekhar, a Politician, currently Education Minister in Bihar Government.
Rajesh Ranjan, a Politician.
Bhola Yadav, leader of RJD.
Nikhil Mandal, a spokesperson of JDU.

Culture
Lorikayan is sung by Ahirs of Bihar, it is a folk song of veer rasa where events from the life of Lorik are described. This is more popular in Bhojpuri, Maithili & Magahi.

See also
Yadava
Ahir
Bihari Ahir
Krishnaut
Yadu

References 

Bihari Ahirs
Social groups of Bihar